Sheffield is a city in Franklin County, Iowa, United States. The population was 1,130 at the time of the 2020 census.

History
Sheffield was platted in 1874, and it was named for a personal friend of the founder's. Sheffield was incorporated in 1876.

Geography
Sheffield, IA is located at  (42.893649, −93.217067).

Demographics

2010 census
As of the census of 2010, there were 1,172 people, 480 households, and 323 families living in the city. The racial makeup of the city was 98.2% White, 0.2% African American, 0.3% Native American, 0.5% Asian, 0.1% Pacific Islander, 0.1% from other races, and 0.6% from two or more races. Hispanic or Latino of any race were 0.9% of the population.

There were 480 households, of which 27.7% had children under the age of 18 living with them, 58.5% were married couples living together, 5.4% had a female householder with no husband present, 3.3% had a male householder with no wife present, and 32.7% were non-families. 29.8% of all households were made up of individuals, and 14.6% had someone living alone who was 65 years of age or older. The average household size was 2.36 and the average family size was 2.93.

The median age in the city was 44.6 years. 23.5% of residents were under the age of 18; 6.7% were between the ages of 18 and 24; 20.3% were from 25 to 44; 26.6% were from 45 to 64; and 22.7% were 65 years of age or older. The gender makeup of the city was 47.4% male and 52.6% female.

2000 census
As of the census of 2000, there were 930 people, 369 households, and 259 families living in the city. The racial makeup of the city was 99.14% White, 0.32% Asian, and 0.54% from two or more races. Hispanic or Latino of any race were 0.65% of the population.

There were 369 households, out of which 30.4% had children under the age of 18 living with them, 58.5% were married couples living together, 8.4% had a female householder with no husband present, and 29.8% were non-families. 27.6% of all households were made up of individuals, and 20.9% had someone living alone who was 65 years of age or older. The average household size was 2.37 and the average family size was 2.86.

23.4% are under the age of 18, 6.8% from 18 to 24, 21.3% from 25 to 44, 22.9% from 45 to 64, and 25.6% who were 65 years of age or older. The median age was 44 years. For every 100 females, there were 84.9 males. For every 100 females age 18 and over, there were 74.9 males.

The median income for a household in the city was $38,594, and the median income for a family was $48,472. Males had a median income of $31,544 versus $22,237 for females. The per capita income for the city was $16,980. About 3.6% of families and 5.3% of the population were below the poverty line, including 0.9% of those under age 18 and 15.1% of those age 65 or over.

Education
Sheffield is part of the West Fork Community School District, formed in 2011 by the merger of the Sheffield–Chapin–Meservey–Thornton (SCMT) Community School District and the Rockwell–Swaledale Community School District. SCMT was formed in 2007 by the merger of the Sheffield–Chapin Community School District and the Meservey–Thornton Community School District. Sheffield–Chapin, in turn, formed in 1960 from the merger of the Sheffield Community School District and the Chapin Community School District.

Notable person
Fred Schwengel; represented Iowa's 1st congressional district for over a decade.

References

External links
 City website
 Sheffield Press

Cities in Franklin County, Iowa
Cities in Iowa
Populated places established in 1876
1876 establishments in Iowa